Chierico is an Italian surname. Notable people with the surname include:

Francesco di Antonio del Chierico (1433–1484), Italian manuscript illuminator
Odoacre Chierico (born 1959), Italian footballer and manager
Luca Chierico (born 2001, Italian footballer, son of Odoacre

See also
 Chierici, surname
 Monte Chierico, a mountain of Lombardy, Italy

Italian-language surnames